The 2008 Tour Down Under was the 10th edition of the Tour Down Under road cycling stage race, taking place from 22 to 27 January in and around Adelaide, South Australia. The Tour Down Under was the first race outside of Europe to be given ProTour status by the UCI.

The race was preceded by an opening race called Down Under Classic, not part of the UCI ProTour competition.

Stage results

Stage 1, 22 January, Mawson Lakes–Angaston, 129 km

Stage 2, 23 January, Stirling – Hahndorf, 148 km

Stage 3, 24 January, Unley – Victor Harbor, 139 km

Stage 4, 25 January, Mannum – Strathalbyn, 134 km

Stage 5, 26 January, Willunga – Willunga, 147 km

Stage 6, 27 January, Adelaide East End Circuit, 88 km

Final standing

General classification

Mountains classification

Points classification

Young classification

Team classification

Classification leadership

Individual 2008 UCI ProTour standings after race
As of 27 January 2008, after the Tour Down Under

After winning 4 stages of Tour Down Under and the overall classification, German André Greipel is the first leader of 2008 UCI ProTour.

Teams

The Australian national team called Team UniSA–Australia was the only non-UCI ProTour team invited to the race.

See also
 2008 in Road Cycling

External links
2008 Tour Down Under Official Website
2008 Tour Down Under CyclingFever Racespecial

References

2008
2008 UCI ProTour
2008 in Australian sport
2008 in Oceanian sport
January 2008 sports events in Australia